Berthold's worm lizard (Leposternon infraorbitale) is a worm lizard species in the family Amphisbaenidae. It is endemic to Brazil.

References

Leposternon
Reptiles of Brazil
Endemic fauna of Brazil
Reptiles described in 1859
Taxa named by Arnold Adolph Berthold